Leilasteridae is a family of echinoderms belonging to the order Valvatida.

Genera:
 Leilaster Clark, 1938
 Mirastrella Fisher, 1940

References

Valvatida
Echinoderm families